"Lights Down Low" is a song by American singer-songwriter and record producer Bei Maejor. The song, released on March 23, 2012, as a digital download, serves as the second single from his debut studio album. The song features rapper Waka Flocka Flame and was produced by Maejor himself. Maejor brought in Siraaj Amnesia James (Encore) for live horns on the record.

Music video 
The music video was released on May 22, 2012.

Chart performance 
The song first charted on the week of March 19, 2012, on the US Hot R&B/Hip-Hop Songs at number eighty-five. It has since peaked at number sixty-eight.

Charts

Release history

References

2011 songs
2012 singles
RCA Records singles
Maejor songs
Songs written by Maejor
Song recordings produced by Maejor
Waka Flocka Flame songs
Songs written by Waka Flocka Flame